Gorge Road is a South Australian secondary road, connecting the Adelaide suburbs of Campbellltown and Athelstone with the towns of Cudlee Creek and Chain of Ponds. It has been designated route B31 for most of its length.

Major intersections

References

See also

Roads in South Australia